Aloysius Agbo is an Anglican bishop in Nigeria: he is the current Bishop of Nsukka.

Agbo was born on 15 September 1967  in Akpani, Enugu State. He was educated at  Trinity Theological College, Umuahia and the University of Nigeria. He was ordained deacon in 2000, and priest in 2001. He was the Archdeacon of Enugu-Ezike until his election as bishop in 2008. He is also a Justice of the Peace of Enugu State.

Notes

Living people
Anglican bishops of Nsukka
21st-century Anglican bishops in Nigeria
People from Enugu State
1967 births
Trinity Theological College, Umuahia alumni
University of Nigeria alumni
Church of Nigeria archdeacons